Poland competed at the 2020 Summer Paralympics in Tokyo, Japan, from 24 August to 5 September 2021.

Medalists

Archery 

Łukasz Ciszek and Milena Olszewska have both qualified to compete.

Men

Women

Athletics 

Men's track

Men's field

Women's track

Women's field

Badminton 

Bartłomiej Mróz has qualified to compete.

Cycling 

Krystian Giera, Renata Kałuża, Justyna Kiryla, Marcin Polak, Dominika Putyra, Rafał Szumiec and Rafał Wilk have all qualified to compete.

Track

Pursuits and time trials

Men

Women

Equestrian 

Poland qualified one athlete.

Paracanoeing 

Poland has qualified two athlete in men's VL2 & women's KL3 events, Katarzyna Kozikowska, Kamila Kubas, Mateusz Surwiło and Jakub Tokarz.

Powerlifting

Justyna Kozdryk, Grzegorz Lanzer, Paulina Przywecka-Puziak, Sławomir Szymański, Mariusz Tomczyk and Marzena Zięba have all qualified to compete.

Men

Women

Rowing

Poland qualified one boat in the mixed double sculls for the games by finishing sixth at A-final and securing the six of eight available place at the 2019 World Rowing Championships in Ottensheim, Austria.

Qualification Legend: FA=Final A (medal); FB=Final B (non-medal); R=Repechage

Shooting

Poland entered three shooters into the Paralympics.

Swimming 

Nine Polish swimmers qualified to compete at the Games.

Men

Women

Table tennis

Poland entered nine athletes into the table tennis competition at the games. Patryk Chojnowski & Natalia Partyka qualified from 2019 ITTF European Para Championships which was held in Helsingborg, Sweden and other seven athletes via World Ranking allocation.

Men

Women

Wheelchair fencing

Adrian Castro, Kinga Dróżdż, Patricia Haręza, Michal Nalewajek, Dariusz Pender and Grzegorz Pluta have all qualified to compete.

Men

Women

Wheelchair tennis

Poland qualified two player entries for wheelchair tennis. One of them qualified through the world rankings, while the other qualified under the bipartite commission invitation allocation quota.

See also 
 Poland at the Paralympics
 Poland at the 2020 Summer Olympics

References 

Nations at the 2020 Summer Paralympics
2020
2021 in Polish sport